Holiday From Myself is a 1952 West German comedy film directed by Hans Deppe and starring Rudolf Prack, Marianne Hold and Willy Fritsch. It was shot at the Göttingen Studios with sets designed by the art director Ernst H. Albrecht. It is a remake of Deppe's 1934 film of the same title.

Cast
 Rudolf Prack as George B. Stefenson
 Marianne Hold as Eva von Dornberg
 Willy Fritsch as Dr. Hartung
 Grethe Weiser as Käthe Greiser, genannt Lieschen
 Paul Henckels as Heinrich Stumpe, genannt Philipp
 Oskar Sima as Ferdinand Unterkirchner, genannt August
 Hannelore Bollmann as Henny Busch, genannt Hannelore
 Gunnar Möller as Michael Matz, genannt Thomas
 Werner Fuetterer as Stone, Stefensons Privatsekretär
 Ewald Wenck as Lehmann, Kastellan
 Hans Hermann Schaufuß as Heinz Tiedemann, genannt Alexander
 Carsta Löck as Frau Mohr, Wirtschafterin
 Irene Naef as Liane Harrison, genannt Minna
 Erna Sellmer
 Ursula Barlen
 Karin Luesebrink
 Else Reval as Klärchen Tiedemann
 Edith Schneider

References

Bibliography 
 Hans-Michael Bock and Tim Bergfelder. The Concise Cinegraph: An Encyclopedia of German Cinema. Berghahn Books, 2009.

External links 
 

1952 films
1952 comedy films
German comedy films
West German films
1950s German-language films
Films directed by Hans Deppe
Films based on German novels
Remakes of German films
Gloria Film films
1950s German films
Films shot at Göttingen Studios